Jesús Torres (born 30 August 1954) is a Venezuelan former cyclist. He competed in the individual road race event at the 1980 Summer Olympics.

References

External links
 

1954 births
Living people
Venezuelan male cyclists
Olympic cyclists of Venezuela
Cyclists at the 1980 Summer Olympics
Place of birth missing (living people)
20th-century Venezuelan people